Rancho Mirage is a city in Riverside County, California, United States. The population was 17,218 at the 2010 census, up from 13,249 at the 2000 census, but the seasonal (part-time) population can exceed 20,000. Incorporated in 1973 and located between Cathedral City and Palm Desert, it is one of the nine cities of the Coachella Valley (Palm Springs area).

It is home to and has been home to a number of celebrities, including Don Sutton, Frank Sinatra, Dean Martin, Bing Crosby, Sammy Davis Jr., Lucille Ball, Bob Hope, Billie Dove and Gerald and Betty Ford. It is a low-density desert-resort community with resorts, golf courses, and country clubs in the Coachella Valley within the Colorado Desert section of the Sonoran Desert. It is nestled along the foothills of the Santa Rosa Mountains in the south and is located between the cities of Palm Springs and Palm Desert. It is adjacent to Cathedral City, Palm Desert, and Unincorporated Thousand Palms.

It has been nicknamed "Playground of the Presidents" and "Golf Capital of the World." The city has hosted and currently hosts a variety of golf and tennis tournaments, including the Ryder Cup, Desert Classic (PGA Tour), Davis Cup, and the LPGA Tour (Chevron Championship).

History
Native Americans came to the area 2,000 years ago. The local tribe in Rancho Mirage is the Agua Caliente Indian tribe of Cahuilla Indians. The tribe was almost annihilated by smallpox in 1862–63 but survived, establishing a resort and casino within the city limits. An ancient Native-American trade route, the Halchidhoma trade route, follows the water holes and water springs along the foothills of the Santa Rosa Mountains. This trail is now partially California State Route 111 in Rancho Mirage. The trade route originally reached from the Pacific Ocean in the west to central Arizona, and was used for centuries for trading, food, and for religious purposes. About 1,000 years ago, the local Cahuilla tribes were introduced to pottery from Native American tribes by the Colorado River. The Spaniards also knew of the Coco-Mariposa Trail in the 1820s when they would send letters by Cahuilla runners along the trail to the mission in Tucson, Arizona. The natural environment in Rancho Mirage has supplied the Cahuilla people with various water sources. Although rare in such arid desert environments, the Cahuilla had access to Magnesia Spring in Magnesia Spring Canyon, which is 1.5 miles from Whitewater River. In addition, a variety of natural springs are situated along the San Andreas Fault line near Indio Hills.

Throughout the 1920s, the area was a desert area dotted with date and grape ranches. In 1928,  here were purchased by the Southland Land and Realty Company. Access was planned by camel on roads given North-African names, including Tunis Road, Tangier Road, and Sahara Road. The 1929 Depression put an end to the plans. A few years later, a Los Angeles realtor, Lawrence Macomber, purchased hundreds of acres here. Along with Don Cameron, the two began offering property here advertised as “fifteen minutes from Palm Springs, CA.” They were able to attract actor Frank Morgan, among others, until the onset of World War II brought development to an end once again. In 1944, hundreds of acres were bought by Major A. Ronald Button. He described it as “the most wind free area I could find in the desert.” Two years later, in 1946, Henry L. Gogerty established an airstrip here and later launched the Desert Air Hotel and Airpark.

The Annenberg Estate or 'Sunnylands', owned by philanthropists Walter and Leonore Annenberg, was popular with the wealthy and powerful, including Frank Sinatra, Bob Hope, Fred Astaire, Ginger Rogers, Patrick Macnee, Zeppo Marx and Mary Martin. Several U.S. Presidents vacationed at the Annenberg estate, including Richard Nixon, Ronald Reagan, and Gerald Ford. President Ford later bought a house in Rancho Mirage and was living there at the time of his death in 2006. The Betty Ford Center, an addiction rehabilitation center, is located in Rancho Mirage at the Eisenhower Medical Center. President Barack Obama also used Sunnylands for summit meetings with world leaders during his administration.

Some of the first places of accommodation to be established were the White Sun Guest Ranch and Wonder Palms Ranch, and later Desert Air Hotel and Thunderbird Ranch in the 1940s. The 320-acre Desert Air Hotel was purchased by the Rancho Las Palmas Country Club in the 1970s. Rancho Las Palmas has Spanish architecture consisting of wood walls, Saltillo tiles, and high ceilings. The resort, which is the city’s third-largest employer, is located on a 249-acre property in the center of Rancho Mirage, across Bob Hope Drive from The River, an outdoor shopping center. It has a 27-hole golf course.

Thunderbird Ranch, which opened in 1946, was purchased by Johnny Dawson, who established Coachella Valley’s first 18-hole golf course. Thunderbird Country Club was established in 1950, and the golf cart or electric golf cart is rumored to have been invented at Thunderbird. Ford Thunderbird is also named for the country club. Tamarisk Country Club soon followed in the 1950s, and later an array of country clubs were established in the city: Desert Island Golf and Country Club in 1971, Sunrise Country Club in 1974, Mission Hills Country Club in 1979, the Club at Morningside (1982), Rancho Mirage Country Club (1985), and Westin Mission Hills Resort and Spa (1987). Rancho Mirage was incorporated in 1973 from a merger of five unincorporated areas known as the "Cove communities" (Rancho Mirage, Desert, Palmas, Tamarisk, and Thunderbird), and had 3,000 permanent residents at the time.

In 2001, the Agua Caliente Band of Cahuilla Indians established the Agua Caliente Casino on the intersection of Bob Hope Drive and Ramon Road off Interstate 10. It was the second casino to be built in the Coachella Valley. The casino is a popular destination for locals, tourists, and gambling enthusiasts. In 2008 the tribal board completed the expansion of the Agua Caliente resort, which includes a 16-story hotel and spa, as well as remodeling the casino and expanding the parking structures. A theater for top-name entertainers opened in 2009. Though the Agua Caliente Resort and Casino was just outside the border of Rancho Mirage in an unincorporated area, the City of Rancho Mirage included the property as part of the city in an agreement with the tribe so they would have access to police and firefighting services.

Rancho Mirage has expanded its economy from one based on seasonal, resort-based golfing and low-paying rentals, to include light industry and commerce near the I-10 and high-end retail centers like The River shopping complex.

A new residential development for senior citizens by Pulte Homes, Inc., known as Del Webb Rancho Mirage, will open in the year 2020. It is the third local development by the company after Sun City Palm Desert and Sun City Shadow Hills in Indio.

In March 2021, it was announced that Rancho Mirage would be the site of first US neighborhood composed completely of 3D-printed, zero net energy homes. The project is a joint effort from companies Palari and Mighty Buildings. It will comprise 15 homes, and are expected to be completed by 2022.

In February 2022, The Walt Disney Company announced that Rancho Mirage will be the location of its first Storyliving by Disney community. Named Cotino, the community will be developed in collaboration with DMB Development of Scottsdale, Arizona.

Etymology
The name is both Spanish (“Rancho”) and French (“Mirage”). One story of the name’s origin relates to a woman of the name Ruth Wheeler who visited Magnesia Falls Canyon and named the ranch she saw in a distance a mirage. The area adopted the name Rancho Mirage in 1934. The City of Rancho Mirage was incorporated under the same name on August 3, 1973.

Presidential history

Rancho Mirage has been nicknamed the "Playground of the Presidents" due to its extensive history of U.S. presidents residing in and visiting the city. For example, President Harry Truman regularly visited the Tamarisk Country Club, while President Dwight D. Eisenhower lived nearby. President Gerald Ford and First Lady Betty Ford were residents of Rancho Mirage for thirty years. The Fords moved to Thunderbird Country Club after leaving office.

Walter and Leonore Annenberg's estate, Sunnylands, became known as the western White House during the Richard Nixon administration in the 1960s. At the time, the estate also became the biggest single-family home in the county. President Dwight D. Eisenhower also stayed here and President Richard Nixon wrote the last State of the Union here. President Ronald Reagan was also a regular visitor at Sunnylands and Presidents Gerald Ford, Jimmy Carter, Bill Clinton, and George W. Bush have all been visitors here. While President George H. W. Bush had an official summit here with Japanese Prime Minister Toshiki Kaifu in 1990, Queen Elizabeth II of Britain visited in 1980. President Barack Obama spent two days here in 2013 where he visited with President Xi Jinping of China. President Obama then became the eighth U.S. president to having visited Sunnylands. President Ronald Reagan attended eighteen New Year's Eve celebrations in Rancho Mirage, including every year during the Reagan Administration.

President George H. W. Bush played golf with Bill Clinton in Rancho Mirage throughout the 1990s. President Richard Nixon went to Rancho Mirage a month prior to announcing his resignation from office. Nixon signed the Sunnylands’ guestbook on the day he was issued a full pardon from President Ford. Thunderbird Country Club has hosted presidents such as John F. Kennedy, Lyndon B. Johnson, Richard Nixon, Gerald Ford, George H.W. Bush, and Dwight D. Eisenhower. President Barack Obama visited the country club on Presidents Day in 2020. President Obama hosted three world summits in Rancho Mirage during his presidency. He hosted the first-ever U.S. summit with the Association of Southeast Asian Nations (ASEAN) in Rancho Mirage on February 15–16, 2016. He also hosted King Abdullah II of Jordan here in 2014.

President Donald Trump visited a fundraising event at Porcupine Creek in Rancho Mirage in February 2020.

President Gerald Ford died in 2006 at his home in Rancho Mirage. First Lady Betty Ford died on July 8, 2011, in Rancho Mirage.

Geography

Whitewater River (Agua Blanco), a perennial stream, flows through the city in a southeasterly direction before discharging into the Salton Sea. Another creek, the Magnesia Spring Creek, is located in Magnesia Spring Canyon where the 40 ft. tall waterfall Magnesia Falls also is found. A flood along Magnesia Spring Creek’s alluvial fan in 1979 led to one death and $7 million in damages. Concrete-lined spillways have since been installed by the U.S. Army Corps of Engineers. Earthquakes are also somewhat common, and on July 8, 1986, an earthquake led to the destruction of 20 buildings and homes, along with big damages to roads and other structures.

A number of street names are named for celebrities, entertainers, and presidents who resided in the city, including Gerald Ford Drive, Ginger Rogers Road, Frank Sinatra Drive (formerly Wonder Palms Road), Bob Hope Drive (formerly Rio del Sol), Kaye Ballard Lane, Danny Kaye Road, Dinah Shore Drive, Dean Martin Drive, and Bing Crosby Drive. Bing Crosby established the Blue Skies Village Mobile Home Park in 1953 and named its streets after celebrities such as Burns and Allen, Jack Benny, Greer Garson, Claudette Colbert, and Barbara Stanwyck.

A stretch of California State Route 111 in Rancho Mirage has earned the moniker "Restaurant Row" as there are over thirty eateries located between Bob Hope Drive and Frank Sinatra Drive. A number of these are located at the River at Rancho Mirage, a 30-acre outdoor shopping center. The area surrounding The River is also known as Downtown Rancho Mirage. On a per-capita basis, the city is home to one eatery for every 240 residents, making it the city in the Coachella Valley with the most restaurants per capita.

Ecology

Flora
The native flora is characterized by cacti and shrubs. Creosote bush, Bur sage, Palo verde, Desert willow, Cat's claw, Mesquite, Screwbean, and Brittle bush are some naturally occurring plant species. The California fan palm, which is the only palm tree native to the region, is found in areas of freshwater sources, including by Magnesia Spring Creek and Whitewater River.

Over 1,000 wild plant species are found in the Coachella Valley. Besides desert flowers, cacti, and palm trees, there are ephemeral flowers, ferns, vines, and shrubs. The vast majority of these species are able to live through extended periods of non to little precipitation, including local cacti species as the California barrel cactus, which is the biggest of the 20 native species of cacti in the Coachella Valley. Several of the local desert species are edible, including cactus fruits from the Beaver tail cactus, California barrel cactus, and the Prickly pear cacti. Fruits and flowers from several Yucca species are also edible, as well as the seed pods and blossoms of the Mesquite. Some local species are poisonous, including Jimsonweed and Locoweed. Springs and streams are home to species such as the California fan palm, which is North America's largest palm species, along with other common tree species in oasis environments such as the Willow, Fremont's cottonwood, California sycamore, Honey-pod mesquite, and White alder. Other species include the Smoke tree, Palo verde, Ironwood, Desert willow, Stream orchid, Creosote bush, Burrobush, Brittlebush, Sand verbena, Desert primrose, and Desert sunflower.

Fauna

The fauna consists of over 20 species of mammals. Some native carnivores include the Gray fox, Coyote, Ringtail cat, Bobcat, and the Desert Kit Fox. Other species include the Southwestern Willow Flycatcher, Bell's Vireo, Prairie Falcon, and the Peninsular Bighorn Sheep. Another notable species of wildlife is the endemic Coachella Valley fringe-toed lizard. The Sonoran Desert has eleven species of rattlesnakes - more than anywhere else in the world. Other notable species include the Gila monster, Chuckwalla, Horned lizard, Desert iguana, Vulture, Desert tortoise, Scorpion, and Javelina. Black bears are rare, however, they inhabit the surrounding mountains and have been sighted on numerous occasions. Four species of Scorpion are found in the Coachella Valley, none of which are considered dangerous to humans. The most common species is the Dune scorpion or Desert sand scorpion (Paruroctonus mesaensis) but the valley is also home to the Giant hairy scorpion (Hadrurus arizonensis), which is the largest species of scorpion in the United States.

Rancho Mirage has adopted the Peninsular Bighorn Sheep as its "community icon" and its official city symbol. The city has also adopted a bighorn ram as its official city logo. The Peninsular Bighorn Sheep has been on the U.S. federal list of endangered species since 1998 (or 2004). In 2002, the city invested $1.2 million in constructing a 3.5-mile fence to separate the rams from civilization. The 8-ft. mesh fence was installed between the California State Route 111 and the peaks of the Santa Rosa Mountains. When the city was incorporated in 1973, 1,200 sheep lived in the Peninsular Ranges which consist of the San Jacinto and Santa Rosa Mountains. By 1995, the number of sheep was 276 but reached 400 in 2002.

The fauna consists of species adapted to desert, temperature extremes, and to lack of moisture. 450 vertebrate species have been recorded in the Coachella Valley including 347 species of birds, 58 species of mammals, 40 species of reptiles, and eight species of amphibians. The largest native mammal, the Bighorn sheep, can reach 200 pounds in weight. Large predators include the Bobcat, Mountain lion, Kit fox, Ring-tailed cat, Coyote, and Gray fox. Some other species include the Antelope ground squirrel, Roadrunners, Side-blotched lizard, and several species of scorpions, centipedes, and rattlesnakes. Some bird species, including the White-crowned sparrow and Ruby-crowned kinglet, spend winters in the Coachella Valley before flying to colder climates during the hot summer months. The Coachella Valley is home to four endangered or threatened species, including the Desert pupfish, Desert tortoise, Desert slender salamander, and the Coachella Valley fringe-toed lizard. Threatened or endangered species in Rancho Mirage include the Peninsular Bighorn sheep, Fringe-toed lizard, Desert tortoise, Southwestern willow flycatcher, Desert slender salamander, Peregrine falcon, and Least Bell's vireo.

Climate 
Rancho Mirage’s climate is a hot desert climate, with hot and dry summers, often with temperatures reaching . Winters are short and mild, with chances of night frost occurring only in December and January. Rancho Mirage is one of nine cities situated in the Coachella Valley, a  valley that is an extension of the Sonoran Desert to the southeast. It is located in the Colorado Desert, which is a name used for the California section of the Sonoran Desert. Climatically, Rancho Mirage is dominated by hot temperatures and perception that averages less than ten inches a year. Even in the coldest month, January, temperatures below  are rare.

The climate of the Coachella Valley is influenced by the surrounding geography. High mountain ranges on three sides and a south-sloping valley floor all contribute to its unique and year-round warm climate, with the warmest winters in the western United States. Under  of annual precipitation are average, with over 350 days of sunshine per year.

Demographics

2010
The 2010 United States Census reported that Rancho Mirage had a population of 17,218. The racial makeup of Rancho Mirage was 15,267 (88.7%) White (81.7% Non-Hispanic White), 256 (1.5%) African American, 94 (0.5%) Native American, 651 (3.8%) Asian, 14 (0.1%) Pacific Islander, 598 (3.5%) from other races, and 338 (2.0%) from two or more races. Hispanic or Latino of any race were 1,964 persons (11.4%).

The census reported that 17,154 people (99.6% of the population) lived in households, 16 (0.1%) lived in non-institutionalized group quarters, and 48 (0.3%) were institutionalized.

There were 8,829 households, 1,031 (11.7%) had children under the age of 18 living in them, 4,159 (47.1%) were opposite-sex married couples living together, 453 (5.1%) had a female householder with no husband present, 213 (2.4%) had a male householder with no wife present. There were 316 (3.6%) unmarried opposite-sex partnerships, and 454 (5.1%) same-sex married couples or partnerships. 3,055 households (34.6%) were one person and 1,961 (22.2%) had someone living alone who was 65 or older. The average household size was 1.94. There were 4,825 families (54.6% of households); the average family size was 2.46.

The age distribution was 1,828 people (10.6%) under the age of 18, 508 people (3.0%) aged 18 to 24, 1,885 people (10.9%) aged 25 to 44, 5,415 people (31.4%) aged 45 to 64, and 7,582 people (44.0%) who were 65 or older. The median age was 62.3 years. For every 100 females, there were 97.7 males. For every 100 females age 18 and over, there were 97.2 males.

There were 14,243 housing units at an average density of 573.5 per square mile; of the occupied units 7,089 (80.3%) were owner-occupied and 1,740 (19.7%) were rented. The homeowner vacancy rate was 5.0%; the rental vacancy rate was 17.2%. 13,845 people (80.4% of the population) lived in owner-occupied housing units and 3,309 people (19.2%) lived in rental housing units.

Between 2009 and 2013, Rancho Mirage had a median household income of $77,526, with 13.6% of the population living below the federal poverty line.

2000
As of the census of 2000, there were 13,249 people in 6,813 households, including 4,074 families, in the city. The racial makeup of the city was 92.7% White, 0.9% African American, 0.2% Native American, 1.3% Asian, 0.1% Pacific Islander, 3.6% from other races, and 1.3% from two or more races. Hispanic or Latino of any race were 9.4% of the population.

Of the 6,813 households 10.5% had children under the age of 18 living with them, 52.9% were married couples living together, 5.2% had a female householder with no husband present, and 40.2% were non-families. 32.3% of households were one person and 19.8% were one person aged 65 or older. The average household size was 1.9 and the average family size was 2.4.

The age distribution was 10.3% under the age of 18, 2.7% from 18 to 24, 14.0% from 25 to 44, 30.0% from 45 to 64, and 43.0% 65 or older. The median age was 61 years. For every 100 females, there were 91.8 males. For every 100 females age 18 and over, there were 91.1 males. Rancho Mirage owes its legacy to being a retirement haven for senior citizens since the 1950s. The notion of building a new airport 30 minutes away (the Desert Cities Regional Airport in Coachella) from Rancho Mirage is still under debate.

The median household income was $59,826 and the median family income was $78,384. Males had a median income of $50,027 versus $36,529 for females. The per capita income for the city was $58,603. About 4.4% of families and 5.9% of the population were below the poverty line, including 9.4% of those under age 18 and 3.2% of those age 65 or over.

Economy

The Rancho Mirage City Council has adopted a $28.8 million budget for fiscal year 2021–22. Sales and hotel taxes are the two biggest sources of revenue for the city, making up 51 percent of Rancho Mirage’s annual revenue. Transient occupancy taxes (TOT) provides 31 percent of the revenue, while sales taxes, Rancho Mirage’s second-biggest revenue source, make up nearly 20 percent of city revenue. About 43 percent of city expenditures are allocated to public safety, the city’s biggest annual expense. Most of this expense is allocated to the Riverside County Sheriff's Department.

The River at Rancho Mirage is an outdoor venue for entertainment, dining, and shopping. It is home to a variety of shops, restaurants, an amphitheater, a gallery, and a multiscreen movie theater. The surrounding area has been named Downtown Rancho Mirage.

Top employers
According to Rancho Mirage Economic Development, 10,000 people are employed by 1,700 different business organizations. According to Rancho Mirage's 2010 Comprehensive Annual Financial Report, the top employers in the city were:

Notable hotels and resorts include The Ritz-Carlton, The Westin Mission Hills Golf Resort and Spa, The Omni Las Palmas, Hilton Garden Inn, and the Agua Caliente Casino Resort Spa. The Ritz-Carlton Rancho Mirage (formerly The Lodge at Rancho Mirage) is a five-star resort situated at a secluded location in the foothills of the Santa Rosa Mountains. This luxury resort has 244 rooms, a  spa, and three swimming pools.

The Agua Caliente Casino Resort Spa has over 1,000 slot machines and video games, 49 gaming tables, and regular live entertainment. There are also several bars, pools, lounges, a 1,000-seat showroom, and six restaurants at the casino resort. It is a $205 million casino resort with 340 rooms and sixteen stories.

The now public 18-hole golf course at Desert Island Golf & Country Club, which was formerly known as The S at Rancho Mirage and Sinatra Resort & Country Club, was designed by British-American golfer Desmond Muirhead. A seven-story building is located on an island in the club's  artificial lake. It is located across Frank Sinatra Dr. from Sunnylands.

Arts and culture

The annual two-day Rancho Mirage Art Affaire is held in Rancho Mirage Community Park (formerly Whitewater Park) and is a fine art and jazz festival held every November. It is an annual weekend celebration with entertainment, food vendors, and art. The Art Affaire features about 100 arts and crafts exhibits but also food, jazz entertainment, wine tasting, and more. It is Rancho Mirage’s biggest community event and attracts 10,000 annual visitors.

The Rancho Mirage Amphitheater, which is located in Rancho Mirage Community Park, was established in 2016 and offers free concerts throughout the year. It plays host to the free annual outdoor concert series "Music in the Park." The amphitheater has seating for up to 1,000 spectators. Former entertainers at the venue have included Blue Öyster Cult, Rodney Atkins, Thompson Square, Pam Tillis, Pablo Cruise, Thelma Houston, Roberta Gambarini, Maxine Nightingale, Diane Schuur, and Mickey Thomas.

The Children's Discovery Museum of the Desert has interactive exhibits and programs focused on the local natural environment. The museum features instructive exhibits, picnic areas, an outdoor amphitheater, miniature rock-climbing areas, a sculpture wall, a rope maze, and more. There is also an archeological dig where children can search for Cahuilla artifacts.

The Rancho Mirage Public Library features 62,000 volumes and regularly hosts musical events, exhibits, and various programs. The library hosts the annual International Classical Concert Series along with a number of other musical performances. Public events at the library also include exhibits, movie screenings, book discussions, lectures, family outings, and more. It has been named one of the best libraries in California.

The botanical gardens at Sunnylands Center and Gardens feature over 53,000 plants in its  of desert gardens. The desert botanical gardens opened to the public in 2012 and have a  walking path with 70 species of arid plants surrounded by views of Mount San Jacinto. Guided tours are offered at the historic landmark, which is situated at the foothills of the San Jacinto Mountains. The botanical gardens were designed by architect James Burnett using Vincent van Gogh’s artwork series Olive Trees as his inspiration. The gardens feature rows of Golden barrel cactus, Moroccan mound cactus, Artichoke agave, and species such as Pink hesperaloe, Spanish bayonet, and Palo verde.

Architecture

The 1957 Kenaston House was added to the U.S. National Register of Historic Places in 2016 due to its local architectural significance. Architect E. Stewart Williams designed its distinctive mid-century modern (MCM) design and U-shaped formed. It has cantilevered rooflines, open floor plans, walnut walls, and an exterior of corrugated aluminum and natural rock. The house has been featured in magazines such as W and Elle, and photoshoots for celebrities such as Angelina Jolie, Brad Pitt, Madonna, James Blunt, and Coldplay have taken place at the Kenaston House. The house has four bedrooms, three baths, fifty palm trees, and a six-car garage. It was built for local resident Roderick W. Kenaston.

Another structure known for its mid-century modern architecture, the 1962 Samuel and Luella Maslon House designed by architect Richard Neutra, was demolished in 2002.

As of 2021, there are 72 structures listed on the Rancho Mirage Register of Historic Places, including celebrity homes previously owned by Kaye Ballard, Red Skelton, and Gummo Marx. The houses are designed by notable architects such as E. Stewart Williams, William Cody, Wallace Neff, Hugh M. Kaptur, and Archibald Quincy Jones. The city’s oldest house, the 1934 Casa Chiquita (Ranchito Chiquito) was the first structure added to the register when designated a historic site on June 1, 2003. The 850 sq. ft. house, which was constructed by the Les and M.C. Clancy brothers, was located on the corner of Rancho Palmeras and Follansbee Rd. from 1934-2004. In 2004, it was relocated and reassembled at Rancho Mirage Community Park, one block west of the River at Rancho Mirage. The ranch-style house is constructed with Mediterranean Revival elements and of local rock from the Whitewater River.

The Club at Morningside and Sunnylands were added to the city's Register of Historic Places due to President George H. W. Bush's official summit with Prime Minister Toshiki Kaifu in Rancho Mirage on March 2–3 in 1990.

Places of interest

Rancho Mirage Observatory, houses five telescopes and a 360-degree dome telescope
Sunnylands Center & Gardens, historic estate offering tours. Designated an historic site by the city.
Agua Caliente Casino Resort Spa, $205 million casino resort with occasional concerts and live entertainment
Mission Hills Country Club, host of the ANA Inspiration
Thunderbird Country Club, first golf resort established in a desert environment.
The River at Rancho Mirage, outdoor shopping and dining center in Downtown Rancho Mirage
 Children's Discovery Museum of the Desert, children's museum with exhibits focused on the local natural environment
 Tamarisk Country Club ("The Compound"), former home to the Rat Pack
 Kenaston House, historic building listed on the U.S. National Register of Historic Places
 Santa Rosa and San Jacinto Mountains National Monument, U.S. National Monument that consists of 280,071 acres of wilderness

Sports
Tamarisk Country Club has hosted the Bob Hope Classic nineteen times. Thunderbird Country Club has hosted the Ryder Cup and the Desert Classic of the PGA Tour. It also held a PGA Tour event from 1952–59 and was one of the original golf courses in the tournament that later became the Bob Hope Classic. Mission Hills Country Club hosted the Davis Cup finals in 1978. The Chevron Championship was held at Mission Hills Country Club in 2022, one of five major championships in women’s professional golf (LPGA).

The Dinah Shore Golf Classic is held in Rancho Mirage every March and draws an estimated 15,000 lesbian visitors to the area. It is part of the Kraft Nabisco Championship tournament which is held at the Mission Hills Country Club. In women’s golf, the tournament ranks second only to the U.S. Women's Open.

Rancho Mirage has 12 or 13 golf courses, also known as country clubs or golf resorts. The city's first resort was the Thunderbird Guest Ranch, opened in 1946 for entertainers and business clientele. Other golf resorts are The S at Rancho Mirage, Tamarisk, Mission Hills, Thunderbird, The Springs, Sunrise, Omni Resorts Rancho Las Palmas hotel (opened in 1979 to replace the Desert Air golf and private airport from 1954 to 1978), Morningside, Mission Hills North Course, Westin Hotels Mission Hills resort and Tuscania by Sunrise Company opened in 2006.

Recreation

Some of the most visited hiking trails in the Coachella Valley are found within city limits. Some trails here include the Jack Rabbit Trail, Road Runner Trail, and Big Horn Overlook Trail, which has a trailhead by the Rancho Mirage City Hall. Access to the Mirada Trail System is located behind Rancho Mirage City Hall where trailheads can be found for a number of trails, including the Bighorn Overlook Trail, Chuckwalla Trail, Jack Rabbit Trail, and Road Runner Trail.

Other trails include the Chuckwalla Trail, Butler-Abrams Trail, and the Clancy Lane Trail, which has a trailhead in Rancho Mirage Community Park. An additional trail, the Mirage Trail (also known as the 'Bump and Grind' or the Desert Drive Trail), climbs the Santa Rosa Mountains and offers panoramic views of the surrounding Coachella Valley and neighboring mountains, including views of the San Jacinto Mountains, Salton Sea, La Quinta, and other desert sights. The trail connects with other mountain trails, including Art Smith Trail and Hopalong Cassidy, which leads to Homme-Adams Park in Palm Desert. Its trailhead is located at Desert Drive and follows a wide dirt and gravel path up the Santa Rosa Mountains. It joins the Magnesia Falls Trail after less than a mile.

City officials in Rancho Mirage have worked with the U.S. Bureau of Land Management to further expand and improve desert trail networks. The city also operates various nature and wildlife reserves, such as the Magnesia Springs Ecological Reserve and Rancho Mirage Mountain Reserve, two of several reserves established within city limits to provide habitat for the Peninsular Bighorn Sheep and other local wildlife.

There are six Cahuilla cultural heritage sites within the city limits of Rancho Mirage, including Bradley Canyon, Magnesia Spring, and Edom Hill (Indio Hills).

Parts of the city lie within the Santa Rosa and San Jacinto Mountains National Monument, which makes up 280,071 acres and borders Rancho Mirage in the southwest.

Parks
The city operates the following five public parks:

 Blixseth Mountain Park (access near the corner of Indian Trail and Mirage Road): 7-acre desert mountain park at the foothills of the Santa Rosa Mountains, accessed by a wooden bridge. Features desert landscape, Bighorn sheep displays, trails, native flora, and mountain vistas. The park was dedicated on April 19, 2002, and it is located immediately east of the Magnesia Storm Channel.
 Rancho Mirage Community Park (formerly Whitewater Park): 8.8-acre park featuring a fitness trail, picnic areas, a playground, an amphitheater, and sports facilities including two basketball courts, four tennis courts, and two handball courts. The city’s oldest home dating to 1934 was moved to this park in 2004. The park also hosts annual concerts and events such as the Rancho Mirage Art Affaire. The park is located adjacent to Whitewater River and was originally developed in 1982. The park was expanded in 1994 and in 2015. 
 Rancho Mirage Dog Park: 4-acre park which opened in 2016 on the intersection of Key Largo Ave. and Via Vail. 
 Richard & Annette Bloch Cancer Survivors Park: park adjacent to Rancho Mirage City Hall dedicated as a tribute to survivors of cancer. It is part of the series of parks known as Cancer Survivors Park. It has bronze sculptures, walkways, tiled benches, and a waterfall.
 Michael S. Wolfson Park (trailhead for the Butler-Abrams Trail): 1.7-acre park landscaped with native palm and cactus gardens. The park was dedicated in 1986 and has a Victorian theme. There are several walking paths, decorative lights, picnic areas, bronze Braille plaques, and fountains. The red button near the entrance greets visitors with a recorded message from longtime local resident Frank Sinatra. The park is named for Michael S. Wolfson, mayor of Rancho Mirage from 1973-1986.

An additional park, the 1.3-acre Magnesia Falls Neighborhood Park, is adjacent to Rancho Mirage Elementary School. It is a joint-use facility operated in conjunction with the Family YMCA of the Desert and the Palm Springs Unified School District. The park opened in 1999 and is equipped with a playground, benches, picnic areas, and ball fields.

Nature reserves

Magnesia Spring Ecological Reserve
The Magnesia Spring Ecological Reserve, a 3,800-acre area, was designated a nature reserve by the California Department of Fish and Wildlife in 1975. It is home to wildlife such as the Peninsular bighorn sheep, Coyote, Bobcat, Gray fox, Prairie falcon, Golden eagle, Gambel's quail, and Mourning dove. It became a reserve to preserve and rehabilitate both habitat and access to freshwater sources for the Bighorn sheep. Magnesia Spring Canyon is the only desert palm oasis within city limits. The ecological reserve is located in Magnesia Springs Canyon and is an important habitat site for sensitive species such as the Peninsular Bighorn Sheep, Bell's Vireo, Southwestern Willow Flycatcher, and the Prairie Falcon. It is managed by the California Department of Fish and Wildlife.

Hiking is permitted in the reserve parts of the year. It can be accessed from trails such as the Mirage Trail and Magnesia Spring Falls Trail. It can be reached by following the trail to Magnesia Falls, which has its trailhead at Blixseth Mountain Park, next to Rancho Mirage Elementary School. This trail leads to a variety of oases and waterfalls in the Santa Rosa Mountains and is closed from January 1 to September 30 in order to protect the native Peninsular bighorn sheep. Lower Magnesia Falls is 2.5 miles roundtrip from Blixseth Mountain Park, while the Upper Magnesia Falls waterfall is a 6.5-mile roundtrip hike. This trail eventually joins the Art Smith Trail.

Rancho Mirage Mountain Reserve
Rancho Mirage was the first Coachella Valley city to establish a mountain reserve within its city limits. Rancho Mirage Mountain Reserve, which is approximately two square miles (5,182 acres), was established to provide habitat for the Peninsular Bighorn Sheep. It consists of rocky terrain and a series of canyons and creeks in the Santa Rosa Mountains.

Government

The tribal government of the Agua Caliente Band of Cahuilla Indians. governs over parts of the city where reservation jurisdictions overlap.

In the 2020 U.S. presidential election, 57.8 percent voted for Joe Biden, while 41.2 percent voted for Donald Trump. Hillary Clinton won the 2016 U.S. presidential election in Rancho Mirage.

Rancho Mirage City Hall is located at the intersection of California State Route 111 and Frank Sinatra Dr. It was previously Merton Baker’s real estate office.

Education
There is one elementary school (Rancho Mirage Elementary) and one high school Rancho Mirage High School in the city limits which are part of the Palm Springs Unified School District, the newly renovated Nellie Coffman Middle School is on the city line with Cathedral City. There is one private school, Palm Valley School, which covers grades preschool-12th. The PSUSD is building a new grade-middle school complex on the lands of the former Walter Annenberg estate donated to the PSUSD. The complex has yet to be constructed. Rancho Mirage is also home to a campus of Santa Barbara Business College, a private college that offers academic degrees and career training.

Notable people

In popular culture

At least two novels, Love Child by Andrew Neiderman (1986) and Generation X: Tales for an Accelerated Culture by Douglas Coupland (1991), are set in Rancho Mirage. Both have references to the city and to Palm Springs, as well as the Mojave Desert. A third book, Rancho Mirage: an American Tragedy of Manners, Madness, and Murder by Aram Saroyan (2002), concerns a murder that occurred in the city.

The Bob Cummings Show, a sitcom series starring Bob Cummings, was partially filmed at the Desert Air Hotel and Airpark (today known as Rancho Las Palmas Country Club). The airplane chartering scenes in the Oscar-winning film It's a Mad, Mad, Mad, Mad World (1963) were also shot at the resort. Scenes in the movie also feature Bob Hope Drive and what later would become the Agua Caliente Casino Resort Spa. A Warner Bros. film, Two Guys from Texas (1948), was filmed at Thunderbird Ranch in Rancho Mirage. In 1926, filming took place in Rancho Mirage for the 1928 film The Vanishing Pioneer starring Jack Holt.

The Tamarisk Country Club was featured in the sixth episode of the 2003 Bravo show Boy Meets Boy. The 2003 ABC miniseries Trista & Ryan's Wedding was filmed at The Lodge at Rancho Mirage, now known as the Ritz-Carlton Rancho Mirage.

References

Sources

Further reading
 Mallette, Leo A., (2011), Images of America: Rancho Mirage, Arcadia Publishing, Mount Pleasant, South Carolina

External links

 
 City of Rancho Mirage, "Historic Context"

 
1973 establishments in California
Cities in Riverside County, California
Coachella Valley
Incorporated cities and towns in California
Populated places established in 1973
Populated places in the Colorado Desert